The 2015–16 AFA Senior Male League is the seventeenth season of the AFA Senior Male League, the only football league in Anguilla.  The season began on 15 November 2015.  The league was won by Salsa Ballers FC for the first time.

Teams 

Five teams began the season.  From the seven teams in the league in the previous season Kicks United FC withdrew on 22 October 2015 claiming maltreatment from the Anguillan Football Association.  Roaring Lions FC withdrew claiming stagnation and a lack of viable chances for their players in Anguillan football.

League table 

Table correct to 7 February 2016.

References

External links 

 League table at fifa.com
 League table at rsssf.com

Afa Senior Male League
Afa Senior Male League
AFA Senior Male League seasons
2015–16 in Caribbean football leagues
Football in Anguilla